Esquimalt-Royal Roads is a former provincial electoral district in British Columbia, Canada established by the Electoral Districts Act, 2008.  It was first contested in the 2009 election in which New Democrat, Maurine Karagianis was elected MLA.  It was replaced by Esquimalt-Metchosin prior to the 2017 election.

The district includes communities that surround Esquimalt Harbour, including Esquimalt to the east and Colwood to the west.  The "Royal Roads" in the district's name references the maritime passage that connects the Harbour to the sea and is the namesake of Royal Roads Military College.

Electoral history

British Columbia provincial electoral districts on Vancouver Island
Politics of Victoria, British Columbia